Boletus is a genus of mushroom-producing fungi, comprising over 100 species. The genus Boletus was originally broadly defined and described by Carl Linnaeus in 1753, essentially containing all fungi with hymenial pores instead of gills. Since then, other genera have been defined gradually, such as Tylopilus by Petter Adolf Karsten in 1881, and old names such as Leccinum have been resurrected or redefined. Some mushrooms listed in older books as members of the genus have now been placed in separate genera. These include such as Boletus scaber, now Leccinum scabrum, Tylopilus felleus, Chalciporus piperatus and Suillus luteus. Most boletes have been found to be ectomycorrhizal fungi, which means that they form a mutualistic relationship with the roots system of certain kinds of plants. More recently, Boletus has been found to be massively polyphyletic, with only a small percentage of the over 300 species that have been assigned to Boletus actually belonging there and necessitating the description and resurrection of many more genera.

Phylogenetic tree of Boletus

source:

Edibility

The genus Boletus contains many members which are edible, such as Boletus edulis, Boletus aereus and Boletus barrowsii.

Boletes with red pores may be toxic.

See also

 Bolete eater, a fungal parasite of various Boletus species
 List of Boletus species

References

External links

 
Boletales genera
Taxa named by Carl Linnaeus